Broeck may refer to:

 Van den Broeck, Dutch surname
 Ten Broeck (disambiguation), Dutch surname